The Tagaytay–Calamba Road is a  two- to four-lane, secondary and tertiary road in Laguna and Cavite, Philippines. Albeit discontinuous, it connects the city of Calamba in Laguna and the city of Tagaytay in Cavite. The road's missing link that will connect its Tagaytay and Calamba sections is under construction.

The segment of road from its western terminus at Tagaytay Rotonda to Ligaya Drive, both in Tagaytay, forms part of National Route 421 (N421) of the Philippine highway network, while the rest of the road remains unnumbered.

Route description

Tagaytay
The road starts at the Tagaytay Rotonda, a four-way roundabout with Aguinaldo Highway, Tagaytay–Nasugbu Highway, and Tagaytay–Talisay Road in Tagaytay City. Various restaurants, hotels, residential developments, and tourists attractions could be found along this road. It then intersects the Santa Rosa–Tagaytay Road, which provides access to the South Luzon Expressway, and Ligaya Drive, where N421 turns towards Talisay, Batangas and the road transitions from a secondary road to a tertiary road. It then climbs Mount Sungay and terminates at the People's Park in the Sky. The entire Tagaytay segment is also known as Isaac O. Tolentino Avenue, after the former Tagaytay mayor who served from 1954 to 1980.

Calamba
The road continues at the southwestern boundary of Calamba, Laguna, running east from the northern gate to Tagaytay Highlands. Entirely a tertiary road, it is divided and locally known as Burol Road, Lawa–Punta Road, and Barandal Road, after the barangays those roads traverse through, respectively. It also traverses residential subdivisions and Calamba Premiere Industrial Park. It runs beneath the South Luzon Expressway before terminating at Manila South Road (Old National Highway) in barangay Parian.

References 

Roads in Cavite
Roads in Laguna (province)